Brian Cooper (born November 1, 1993) is an American professional ice hockey defenseman for Växjö Lakers of the Swedish Hockey League (SHL)

Playing career
Cooper was drafted in the fifth round, 127th overall, by the Anaheim Ducks in the 2012 NHL Entry Draft.

Following his collegiate career at Omaha, Cooper made his professional debut for the San Diego Gulls of the American Hockey League (AHL) during the 2015–16 season, where he recorded one assist in five games. On August 24, 2017, he signed a one-year contract extension with the Gulls. On July 10, 2018, he signed a one-year contract with the Milwaukee Admirals of the AHL.

On February 7, 2019, he signed with AIK IF of the HockeyAllsvenskan. On April 27, 2019, he signed with IF Björklöven.

On April 21, 2020, he signed with IK Oskarshamn of the SHL.

Following two seasons with Oskarshamn, Cooper left the club as a free agent and continued in the SHL with Växjö Lakers. He was signed to a two-year contract on 20 April 2022.

International play
On January 13, 2022, Cooper was named to Team USA's roster to represent the United States at the 2022 Winter Olympics.

Career statistics

Regular season and playoffs

International

References

External links
 

1993 births
Living people
AIK IF players
Anaheim Ducks draft picks
Atlanta Gladiators players
Fargo Force players
Ice hockey players from Alaska
IF Björklöven players
Milwaukee Admirals players
Omaha Mavericks men's ice hockey players
IK Oskarshamn players
Ice hockey people from Anchorage, Alaska
Ice hockey players at the 2022 Winter Olympics
Olympic ice hockey players of the United States
San Diego Gulls (AHL) players
Utah Grizzlies (ECHL) players
Växjö Lakers players